George XI (Giorgi XI; 1651 – 21 April 1709), known as Gurgin Khan in Iran, was a Georgian monarch who ruled the Kingdom of Kartli as a Safavid Persian subject from 1676 to 1688 and again from 1703 to 1709. He is best known for his struggle against the Safavids which dominated his weakened kingdom and later as a Safavid commander-in-chief in what is now Afghanistan. Being an Eastern Orthodox Christian, he converted to Shia Islam prior to his appointment as governor of Kandahar.

Life

He was the son of Vakhtang V, whom he succeeded as a ruler of Kartli in 1676. As with many other Georgian rulers, he had to nominally accept Islam and take the name of Shahnawaz II before being able to be confirmed as a viceroy by Shah Solayman I. However, Georgians continued to consider him as their king under his Christian name Giorgi (or "George" in English).

When nearly half-century-long peaceful relations between Kartli and its Persian suzerains significantly deteriorated. George attempted to centralise loose royal authority in Kartli and weaken the Persian influence. He patronised Catholic missioners and had correspondence with Innocent XI. After the Ottoman defeat in the Battle of Vienna George XI hoped to exploit that Empire's new weakness. In a letter to Innocent XI dated April 29, 1687 he vowed to be a Catholic King and declared his readiness and willingness and that of his troops to obey any order of the Roman Pope. According to Catholic missionaries George remained until his death a faithful Catholic.

In 1688, George headed an abortive coup against a Persian governor of the neighboring Georgian region of Kakheti, and attempted, though vainly, to gain an Ottoman support against the Safavid overlordship. In response, Shah Solayman deposed George and gave his crown to the rival Kakhetian prince Erekle I, who then embraced Islam and took the name Nazar-Ali Khan. Abbas Qoli-Khan, the beglarbeg (governor general) of Ganja, was placed in charge of the government in Kakheti and commissioned to reinforce Erekle's positions in Kartli. George fled to Racha in western Georgia, whence he made several attempts to reclaim his possession. In 1696, he managed to stage a temporary comeback and helped his brother Archil to temporarily regain the crown of Imereti in western Georgia, but was eventually forced to withdraw from Kartli again. In 1694, following the death of Solayman, there was a change in the government in Georgia: Abbas-Quli Khan was accused by his rivals of supporting George XI. On the orders of the new shah Soltan Hosayn, he was promptly arrested by Erekle and sent to Isfahan under guard, while of his possessions were confiscated. Qalb-Ali Khan was appointed Abbas-Quli Khan's successor as Persian governor of Kakheti. However, the strife in Georgia as well as the Safavid empire in general forced Husayn to make peace with George who was summoned to Isfahan in 1696. The shah entrusted him with restoring order along the eastern frontiers of the empire and appointed him beglarbeg of Kerman in 1699. It was the beginning of an illustrious but, ultimately, tragic career in the service of the Safavids.

George, aided by his brother Levan, by 1700 had reestablished the shah's sovereignty in Kerman. As a reward, George was restored to the throne of Kartli in 1703, but was not allowed to return to his country. Instead, he was soon assigned to suppress the Afghan rebellion in May 1704. He was granted the title of Gurgin Khan by the Shah and was appointed the viceroy of Kandahar province and sipah salar (commander-in-chief) of the Persian armies. While he was in the field, he entrusted the administration of his country of Kartli to a nephew, the future King Vakhtang VI. Gurgin managed to crush the revolts of Afghan tribes and ruled Kandahar with uncompromising severity. He subdued many of the local leaders and sent Mirwais Khan Hotak, a powerful chieftain of the Ghilji Afghans (Pashtuns), in chains to Isfahan. However, Mirwais Khan managed to gain the favour of the Shah and even to arouse his suspicion against the beglarbeg. Determined to bring about the overthrow of Gurgin, Mirwais Khan staged a carefully planned coup. On April 21, 1709, when the majority of the Georgian troops under Gurgin's nephew, Alexander, were away from Kandahar on a raid against the rebels, Mirwais invited Gurgin on a banquet at his country estate at Kokaron in Kandahar City and assassinated him. The assassinator was supposedly an Afghan warrior, Younis Kakar, one of a tribal chiefs of Mirwais Khan Hotak. Gurgin's small escort was also massacred and Mirwais seized power in Kandahar. He sent to Isfahan the cross and psalms, found at the murdered Georgian general, as the proof of the latter's covert defection.

A punitive expedition into the Afghan lands led by George's nephew, Kay Khusrau, ended in October 1711 disastrously with his death and the destruction of nearly his entire force of 30,000.

Family and children
George XI was married twice. He married first Tamar, daughter of Prince David Davitishvili in 1676. She died on 4 December 1683, having mothered two children:
 Prince Bagrat (died 1692/94), who was sent to the shah as a political hostage and died at Herat;
 Princess Mariam (died 1715), who married in 1687 David Kvenipniveli, Duke of Ksani Duchy of Ksani and had nine children.

George XI married his second wife Khoreshan (died 24 February 1695), daughter of Prince Giorgi Mikeladze, at Kojori in 1687. She bore him a daughter. 
Princess Rodam of Kartli (d. 1730)

See also
List of the Kings of Georgia
Iranian Georgians
History of Georgia

References

Further reading
Rudi Matthee's biography of Gorgin Khan in Encyclopædia Iranica
Martin Sicker, The Islamic World in Decline: From the Treaty of Karlowitz to the Disintegration of the Ottoman Empire (Hardcover) (2000), Praeger/Greenwood, page 44
The Cambridge History of Iran: Volume 6, the Timurid and Safavid Periods, edited by Peter Jackson, Stanley I Grossman, Laurence Lockhart: Reissue edition (1986), Cambridge University Press, page 315
Willem Vogelsang, The Afghans (2001), Blackwell Publishing 
 Political history of Georgia 1658–1703, excerpt from David Marshall Lang, The Last years of the Georgian Monarchy, 1658–1832

External links

გიორგი XI (In Georgian)
Afghanland – Mirwais Khan Hotaki 

1651 births
1709 deaths
House of Mukhrani
Safavid appointed kings of Kartli
Iranian people of Georgian descent
Former Georgian Orthodox Christians
Converts to Roman Catholicism from Shia Islam
Roman Catholics from Georgia (country)
Safavid governors of Qandahar
Safavid governors of Kerman
Commanders-in-chief of Safavid Iran
17th-century people of Safavid Iran
18th-century people of Safavid Iran
17th-century people from Georgia (country)
18th-century people from Georgia (country)
Shia Muslims from Georgia (country)